Hanaro may refer to:
 Hanaro Telecommunications, a former Internet service provider controlled by the SK Group
 High-Flux Advanced Neutron Application Reactor (HANARO), a nuclear research reactor in Daejeon, Republic of Korea